Frederick Oliver Edward van den Bergh (born 14 June 1992) is an English cricketer. Van Den Bergh is a right-handed batsman who bowls slow left-arm orthodox.  He was born in Bickley, London and educated at Whitgift School and Durham University.

Van den Bergh made his first-class debut for Surrey against Cambridge MCCU in 2011.  In this match, he took three wickets in Cambridge MCCU's first-innings for the cost of 79 runs from 24 overs.  In Surrey's second-innings, he was dismissed by Josh Poysden for a duck. He made his Twenty20 debut for Surrey in the 2018 t20 Blast on 6 July 2018.

References

External links

1992 births
Living people
People from Bickley
People educated at Whitgift School
English cricketers
Surrey cricketers
Durham MCCU cricketers
Alumni of Hatfield College, Durham